Suryamaninagar is one of the 60 Legislative Assembly constituencies of Tripura state in India. It is in West Tripura district and a part of West Tripura (Lok Sabha constituency).

Members of Legislative Assembly

 2013: Raj Kumar Chaudhuri, Communist Party of India (Marxist)

Election results

2018

See also
List of constituencies of the Tripura Legislative Assembly
 Sipahijala district
 Tripura West (Lok Sabha constituency)

References

Sipahijala district
Assembly constituencies of Tripura